Christer Skoog (born 1945) is a Swedish politician and former member of the Riksdag, the national legislature. A member of the Social Democratic Party, he represented Blekinge County between October 1988 and October 2006.

References

1945 births
Living people
Members of the Riksdag 1988–1991
Members of the Riksdag 1991–1994
Members of the Riksdag 1994–1998
Members of the Riksdag 1998–2002
Members of the Riksdag 2002–2006
Members of the Riksdag from the Social Democrats